The Wilson N. Jones Regional Medical Center (WNJ), formerly Texas Health Presbyterian Hospital–WNJ, is a hospital in Sherman, Texas. Named for the Choctaw chief Wilson Nathaniel Jones (1827-1901), it has 237 beds, and employs 1000 staff. It was established in 1914.

In 2014, Alecto Healthcare Services acquired the hospital from Texas Health Resources.

References

External links

Buildings and structures in Grayson County, Texas
Hospitals in Texas
Hospitals established in 1914